Nett also written as Net, is one of the administrative divisions of Pohnpei State, Federated States of Micronesia.

Description
Nett is one of the six municipalities located in the main island of Pohnpei. It corresponds to the north-central sector of the island.  

The population was 6,639 as of 2010. Nett municipality formerly included Kolonia, now a separate administrative division.

Nett has been historically subdivided into 23 sections, districts, or villages (kousapw): Parempei, Lenger, Leprohi, Sekeren, Weipowe, Diadi, Tomwara, Dolokei, Lewetik, Takaieu, Paliais, Seinwar, Meitik, Paremkep, Nansokasok (Nan Sokasok), Eirike (Eirke), Nanipil, Kahmar, Doaroapop, Pohndien, Dolakapw, Mesenieng, and Lehdau. This includes Mesenieng, which is the traditional name of the now separate municipality Kolonia, which is still claimed by Nett municipality as one of its kousapw.

The kousapw are or were further subdivided into peliensapw (farmsteads).

Education
Pohnpei State Department of Education operates public schools:
 Nett Elementary School
 Parem Elementary School

Bailey Olter High School (former Pohnpei Island Central School or PICS) in Kolonia serves students from Nett.

See also
 Madolenihmw
 Kitti (municipality)
 U, Pohnpei
 Sokehs
 Kapingamarangi
 Pingelap
 Sapwuahfik
 Nukuoro
 Mokil
 Kolonia
 Oroluk
 Palikir

References

External links

Municipalities of Pohnpei